Sukhumi District is one of the districts of Abkhazia, One of Georgia’s two breakaway republics. It corresponds to the eponymous Georgian municipality. Its capital is Sukhumi, the town by the same name, which is also the capital of entire Abkhazia. The population of the district is 11,531 according to the 2011 census. The city of Sukhumi is a separate administrative entity with more than 60,000 inhabitants.

Demographics
According to the 2011 Census, Sukhumi District had a population of 11,531:
Armenians (56.1%)
Abkhaz (30.4%)
Russians (7.5%)
Georgians (2.2%)
Greeks (1.3%)
Ukrainians (0.5%)

Settlements
The city of Sukhumi is a separate administrative entity independent of the district. The district's main settlements are:
Eshera
Guma
Kamani
Pskhu

Administration
Lev Avidzba was reappointed as Administration Head on 10 May 2001 following the March 2001 local elections.

On 2 April 2003, President Ardzinba dismissed Lev Avidzba and appointed State Security Service Chairman Zurab Agumava as acting District Head. Agumava remained in this post until in 2006 he was appointed Military Prosecutor by Ardzinba's successor Sergei Bagapsh.

On 21 February 2007, before the local elections, President Bagapsh temporarily prolonged Vladimir Avidzba tenure as Head of the District Administration. After Avidzba was re-elected, he was permanently re-appointed on 21 March.

On 12 June 2012, President Alexander Ankvab dismissed Avidzba for reaching the age of retirement, and awarded him with the order Akhdz-Apsha in the third degree for his long government service. On the same day, Ankvab appointed Head of the Education Department Zhuzhuna Bigvava as Avidzba's successor.

Following the May 2014 Revolution and the election of Raul Khajimba as President, on 28 October 2014 he dismissed Bigvava and appointed Beslan Avidzba as acting Head of the Administration. Avidzba was permanently appointed after local elections were held, on 2 June 2016.

List of Administration Heads

See also

Administrative divisions of Abkhazia
Meri Avidzba, a famous female pilot during the Great Patriotic War

References

 
Districts of Abkhazia
Districts of Georgia (country)